Chris McDuffie is an American musician. A keyboardist, he performed with the Elephant 6 band The Minders and appeared on their 1996 debut EP Come On and Hear. McDuffie later became a member of The Apples in Stereo, first appearing on the album Her Wallpaper Reverie in 1999. He left the band during the production of the 2002 album Velocity of Sound.

Discography

With The Minders
Come On and Hear (1996)

With The Apples in Stereo
Her Wallpaper Reverie (1998)
Look Away + 4 (2000)
The Discovery of a World Inside the Moone (2000)
Let's Go! (2001)
Velocity of Sound (2002)

References 

21st-century American keyboardists
Living people
Year of birth missing (living people)
American rock keyboardists
The Apples in Stereo members
Place of birth missing (living people)